This is a list of cathedrals in Italy, including also Vatican City and San Marino. This is intended to be a complete list of extant cathedrals – i.e., churches that are the seats of bishops – and co-cathedrals. Many former cathedrals and proto-cathedrals are also included, but many more are yet to be added.

Almost all cathedrals in Italy are Roman Catholic, but any that are not are also listed here.

There are many churches in Italy commonly known as Duomo. This is often translated as "cathedral", but not entirely accurately: "duomo" refers to the principal church of a town or city, whatever its status. Clearly, when a cathedral exists, that will often also be a town's principal church, and many cathedrals are thus also "duomi", and vice versa. This is not always so, however: there are places where the cathedral and the principal church are not the same (Bologna, for example); and very many places which are not the seats of bishops have a non-episcopal "duomo" and no cathedral at all. In this list, churches known as "duomo" are only included if they are, or have been, episcopal seats, as above.

There is a very small number of churches, such as that at Monza, which have such exceptional distinction or status that they are comparable in importance to cathedrals without having ever been the seats of bishops, and are commonly known in English as cathedrals. There is a separate (incomplete) list for this small group of churches.

List of cathedrals in Italy

Non-diocesan churches commonly referred to as cathedrals

See also
 List of cathedrals
 List of the Roman Catholic dioceses in Italy
 List of basilicas in Italy

Notes

Sources and external links
 GCatholic.org.com: Cathedrals in Italy

Cathedrals
 
Italy
Cathedrals